Mahal is the seventh studio album by American musician Toro y Moi, released on April 29, 2022, through Dead Oceans, as his first release under this label. The title is derived from the Tagalog word "mahal", which translates to "love" or "expensive" in English.

Track listing

Personnel
Credits adapted from album artwork.

Musicians

 Chaz Bear – bass , keyboard , drums , guitar , vocals , synthesizer , piano 
 Andy Woodward – drums 
 Ruban Nielson – guitar 
 Martín Perna – saxophone , flute 
 Doug Stuart – bass , keyboard 
 Matt Schory – drums 
 Lindsay Olsen – keyboard , vocals 
 Cheflee – drums 
 Anthony Ferraro – drums 
 Shaun Lowecki – drums 
 Sofie Royer – vocals 
 Dylan Lee – guitar 
 Lucky Banks – drums 
 Hannah van Loon – guitar 
 Jonathan Mattson – drums 
 Jared Mattson – guitar 
 Alan Palomo – synthesizer

Charts

References

2022 albums
Toro y Moi albums
Dead Oceans albums